Cill or CILL may refer to:

 Cill or sill, in water navigation, a horizontal ledge in a lock
 Continental Indoor Lacrosse League, a senior men's box lacrosse league in the United States

See also 
 Sill (disambiguation)